Rhombosoleidae is a family of flatfish in the order Pleuronectiformes, comprising nine genera and 19 species; all members of this family are right eye flounders with asymmetrical pelvic fins. Species are typically demersal, living on bottoms in temperate marine waters on the continental shelf, although some species of Rhombosolea enter fresh water in New Zealand. Most are restricted to waters around Australia and New Zealand, though the Remo flounder, Oncopterus darwinii, occurs in the southwestern Atlantic and the Indonesian ocellated flounder, Psammodiscus ocellatus, occurs in Indonesia.

In some traditional classifications, this group was formerly recognised as a subfamily, Rhombosoleinae, of the Pleuronectidae.

Genera

 Ammotretis
 Azygopus
 Colistium
 Oncopterus
 Pelotretis
 Peltorhamphus
 Psammodiscus
 Rhombosolea
 Taratretis

References

Pleuronectidae
Ray-finned fish subfamilies
Taxa named by Charles Tate Regan